, also  or , is the most famous festival in Nagasaki, Japan. It began as a celebration of autumn harvests in the late 16th century and became a shrine festival when Suwa Shrine was founded in 1642. Another purpose was to check for hidden Christians after the ban on Christianity. One of the most famous performances of the festival is the Dragon Dance which was originally performed on New Year's Eve by the Chinese residents of Nagasaki. Rehearsals for the festival begin on June 1. From October 7–9 the presentations of the festival, which vividly reflect Nagasaki's colourful history, spill over from the three festival sites into the streets and create an atmosphere of celebration throughout the city.

See also
 Karatsu Kunchi

External links
  Nagasaki Dento Geino Shinko-kai
  Nagasaki Kunchi, Nagasaki Shimbun

Nagasaki
Festivals in Japan
Tourist attractions in Nagasaki Prefecture
Culture in Nagasaki Prefecture
October events